Crammed Discs is an independent record label whose output blends world music, rock, pop, and electronica. Based in Brussels, Belgium, Crammed was founded in 1980 by Marc Hollander of Aksak Maboul and has since released around 375 albums and 275 singles, working with artists from all over the world (from Western Europe and the US to the Balkans and North & Central Africa, from South America to the Middle East and Japan).

Crammed Discs is run by Marc Hollander (A&R) with Hanna Gorjaczkowska (artist development, marketing, distribution & art direction) and Vincent Kenis (producer, director of the Congotronics Series).

Marc Hollander and Crammed Discs received the WOMEX award in 2004 at the World Music Expo international music trade fair, for being "one of the seminal players on the world music field". However, the label has always systematically worked with electronic music, indie pop and rock artists, and "doesn't see itself as a world music label: it just happens to enjoy working with artists from around the world, some of whom sing in languages other than English" (as stated in the label's manifesto). Crammed has been described as "one of the most boldly eclectic independent labels around" (Pitchfork), as "innovative and groundbreaking" and "visionary", a.o. for steadily avoiding to confine its roster "to one, potentially homogeneous category" and  encouraging artists with plural identities to create new forms of music.

In 2011, Crammed Discs celebrated its 30th anniversary by setting up the Congotronics vs Rockers project, a "superband" including ten Congolese and ten indie rock musicians (including members of Konono No1, Deerhoof, Wildbirds & Peacedrums, Kasai Allstars, Skeletons,  Juana Molina and Vincent Kenis), who collaborated to create a common repertoire and performed at 15 major festivals and venues in ten countries.

From 2008 to 2014, the following artists have joined the Crammed Discs roster: Chicago band Allá, indie pop act Lonely Drifter Karen (from Vienna and Barcelona), London-based Moroccan electronic artist U-cef, Congolese band Staff Benda Bilili, musician/composer/producer Mocky, Belgian band Hoquets, Belgo-Congolese rapper Baloji, Belgian-Colombian band La Chiva Gantiva, French-American artist Maïa Vidal, US bands Skeletons & Megafaun, South African/Dutch band SKIP&DIE, Belgian band Amatorski, Lebanese singer Yasmine Hamdan, Argentinian artist Juana Molina and Ghanaian/Swiss band OY.

The label's latest signings (2016-2020) are Parisian electronic music collective Acid Arab, Portuguese singer & musician Lula Pena, young French-Welsh band Fauna Twin, French experimental pop band Aquaserge, Matias Aguayo & The Desdemonas, the new rock band founded by the German-Chilean electronic music producer, Berlin-based Spanish experimental musician Don The Tiger, French-Chilean band Nova Materia, Lagos/London project Ekiti Sound, Ugandan/British band Nihiloxica, Californian musician Scott Gilmore, renowned producer Pascal Gabriel and his new Stubbleman project, and Palestinian techno duet Zenobia.

Sub-labels
Because of the diversity of the label's output since its early days in the 1980s, its founders chose to create several sub-labels. This policy was discarded during the latter part of the 1990s, because Crammed felt that genre-blending had finally become acceptable.

Made To Measure A composers' series specializing in instrumental and ambient music, soundtracks and works commissioned for films, ballets etc. Notable artists are: Hector Zazou, Arto Lindsay, John Lurie, Yasuaki Shimizu, Minimal Compact and Fred Frith. 36 volumes were released between 1984 and 1995.

SSR Launched in 1988, this electronic music label was A&R'd by DJ Morpheus (a.k.a. Samy Birnbach) and Marc Hollander. 47 albums and numerous singles were released, ranging from early new beat to downtempo, techno, house and hip hop, by artists such as Snooze, Juryman, Carl Craig, Tek 9, DJ Morpheus, Kevin Saunderson and Telex. SSR is short for Sampleur & Sans Reproche.

Language This 'avant dance' sub-label was A&R'd by Tony Thorpe (a.k.a. The Moody Boyz). 10 albums and 22 singles/EPs were released between 1995 and 1999, by artists including Buckfunk 3000 (Si Begg) and Circadian Rhythms (a band led by ex-This Heat member Charles Bullen).

Ziriguiboom Launched in 1998 in collaboration with Brazilian A&R/Producer Béco Dranoff, Ziriguiboom's aim was to present original and as-yet-unexposed aspects of Brazilian music to international audiences. It quickly became one of the global hubs for the new wave of Brazilian music, and has brought Crammed its biggest commercial success to date with Bebel Gilberto's debut album Tanto Tempo (which sold one million units worldwide). Ziriguiboom also signed and released albums by artists such as Celso Fonseca, Cibelle, Zuco 103, Trio Mocotó, Bossacucanova, DJ Dolores, Apollo Nove and the late Suba.

Crammed also had several specialized and one-artist sub-labels:
Cramworld (for contemporary and archival world music releases)
Selector (specialized in drum and bass)
Cramboy (for Tuxedomoon's releases) 
Furax (released Belgian comedians Les Snuls)
The Congotronics Series
Currently the only subsiding Crammed Discs imprints are Congotronics and Made To Measure. Congotronoics is not a sub-label per se, but a collection of releases by Congolese bands who play their own respective styles of electrified traditional music (such as Konono No1 and Kasai Allstars). The series is curated and produced by Vincent Kenis.
As for the Made To Measure composers' series, it is being discreetly revived since 2013 (after having remained inactive for 18 years), as 6 new volumes have recently come out.

Discography (albums)

1980
Aksak Maboul:  Un Peu de l'Âme des Bandits, with Chris Cutler and Fred Frith (LP 1980, CD reissue in 1995, vinyl reissue in 2018)

1981
Aksak Maboul: Onze Danses Pour Combattre la Migraine (originally out in 1977, released on Crammed in 1981, CD reissue in 2003, vinyl reissue in 2015)
Minimal Compact: Minimal Compact (mini-album, 1981, reissued on CD as part of One+One By One)
Band Apart: Band Apart (mini-album)
Family Fodder: Greatest Hits

1982
The Honeymoon Killers: Les Tueurs de la Lune de Miel
Des Airs: Lunga Notte (mini-album)
Hermine: The World On My Plates
Benjamin Lew/Steven Brown: Douzième Journée: le Verbe, la Parure, l'Amour

1983
Minimal Compact: One By One (1983, reissued on CD as part of One+One By One)
Band Apart: Marseille
Zazou Bikaye+CY1: Noir Et Blanc

1984
Made To Measure Vol.1, feat. Aksak Maboul, Benjamin Lew, Minimal Compact, Tuxedomoon
Blaine Reininger/Mikel Rouse: Colorado Suite
Minimal Compact: Deadly Weapons
Karl Biscuit: Regrets Eternels (1984, re-released in 2003 as part of Secret Love - Compiled Electropop Works)

1985
Zazou Bikaye: Mr Manager
Peter Principle: Sedimental Journey
Tuxedomoon: Holy Wars
Minimal Compact: Raging Souls
Tuxedomoon: Half Mute (originally out on Ralph Records in 1980, reissued on Crammed in 1985)
Hector Zazou: Géographies
Karl Biscuit: Fatal Reverie (1985, re-released in 2003 as part of Secret Love - Compiled Electropop Works)
Nadjma: Rapture In Baghdad, feat. Adrian Sherwood

1986
Surfin Dave and The Absent Legends: In Search of a Decent Haircut
Various Artists: Fuck Your Dreams, This Is Heaven, feat. members of Tuxedomoon & Minimal Compact playing covers of 1960s/1970s songs
Colin Newman: Commercial Suicide
Tuxedomoon: Desire (originally out on Ralph Records in 1981, re-issued on Crammed in 1986)
Benjamin Lew/Steven Brown: A propos d'un paysage
Tuxedomoon: Ship of Fools
Mikel Rouse: A Walk In The Woods
John Lurie: Stranger Than Paradise (original soundtrack from the Jim Jarmusch film)
Mahmoud Ahmed: Ere Mela Mela (originally released 1975-76, released on Crammed Discs in 1986, and re-issued as part of the Ethiopiques series in 2000)
Hector Zazou: Reivax au Bongo

1987
Minimal Compact: The Figure One Cuts
Tuxedomoon: You
Minimal Compact: Lowlands Flight
Sussan Deyhim & Richard Horowitz: Desert Equations
Yasuaki Shimizu: Music For Commercials
John Lurie: Down By Law (original soundtrack from the Jim Jarmusch film)
Daniel Schell & Karo: If Windows They Have
Karen Finley: The Truth Is Hard To Swallow
Tuxedomoon: Suite en Sous-Sol/Time To Lose/Short Stories (originally out in 1982 and 1983, re-issued on Crammed in 1987)

1988
Bel Canto: White Out Conditions
Colin Newman: It Seems
Sonoko: La Débutante
Benjamin Lew: Nebka
Tuxedomoon: Pinheads on the Move

1989
Minimal Compact: Live
Zazou Bikaye: Guilty
Dominic Sonic: Cold Tears
Peter Principle: Tone Poems
Samy Birnbach/Benjamin Lew: When God Was Famous
Various Artists: Sampleur et Sans Reproche (SSR compilation)
Bleep (a.k.a. Geir Jenssen a.k.a. Biosphere): The North Pole By Submarine

1990
Bel Canto: Birds Of Passage
Hector Zazou: Géologies
Steven Brown/Delphine Seyrig: De doute et de grâce
Peter Scherer & Arto Lindsay: Pretty Ugly
Zelwer: La fiancée aux yeux de bois
Foreign Affair: East On Fire
Fred Frith: The Top Of His Head
Gabor G.Kristof: Le cri du lézard
Steve Shehan: Arrows
Daniel Schell & Karo: Le Secret de Bwlch
Tuxedomoon: Divine, soundtrack for a Maurice Béjart ballet (1982, reissued on Crammed in 1990)

1991
Dominique Dalcan: Entre l'étoile et le carré
Classic Swede Swede: Toleki Bango (Miles Ahead)
Taraf de Haïdouks: Musique des Tziganes de Roumanie
Ramuntcho Matta: Domino One
Bobvan: Loonychip Classics
Michel Moers: Fishing Le Kiss
Seigen Ono: Nekonotopia Nekonomania
Zap Mama: Zap Mama (retitled Adventures In Afropea for the US release, 1991)
Hector Zazou: Sahara Blue feat. John Cale, Ryuichi Sakamoto, David Sylvian...

1992
Bel Canto: Shimmering Warm and Bright
David Cunningham: Water
Various Artists: Roots Of Rumba Rock 1 (1953-54) (1992, reissued with vol.2 as a double CD in 2006)
The Gruesome Twosome (Samy Birnbach & Bertrand Burgalat): Candy For Strangers
Les Snuls: Les Snuls, bien entendu

1993
Sainkho (Saynkho Namchylak): Out of Tuva
Bobvan: Water Dragon
Various Artists: Roots Of OK Jazz (1993, reissued in 2006)
Brion Gysin: Self-Portrait Jumping
Tuxedomoon: Solve et Coagula
Benjamin Lew: Le Parfum du Raki
Lone Kent: Granite & Sand
Avalon: Earth Water Air Fire

1994
Ramuntcho Matta: 2 l'Amour
Various Artists: Freezone 1: The Phenomenology Of Ambient (2CD)
Zap Mama: Sabsylma
Dominique Dalcan: Cannibale
Taraf de Haïdouks: Honourable Brigands, Magic Horses & Evil Eye
Solar Quest: Orgship
Various Artists: Around The Day in 80 Worlds, compiled by DJ Morpheus a.k.a. Samy Birnbach
Purna Das Baul & Bauls Of Bengal
Various Artists: Jungle Vibes
Various Artists: Renegade Selector

1995
4hero Parallel Universe
John Lurie National Orchestra: Men With Sticks
Harold Budd & Hector Zazou: Glyph
Various Artists: Freezone 2: Variations On A Chill, compiled by DJ Morpheus a.k.a. Samy Birnbach (2 CD)
Various Artists: Miscellaneous (Language compilation)
Various Artists: Jungle Vibes 2 (Selector compilation)
Various Artists: Roots Of Rumba Rock 2 (1954-55) (1995, reissued with vol.1 as a double CD in 2006)
Bio Muse: Wrong
Zelwer: Les dieux sont fâchés/The Gods Are Angry
Aural Expansion: Surreal Sheep

1996
Tek 9: It's Not What You Think It Is !!?!
Snooze: The Man In The Shadow
Various Artists: Freezone 3: Horizontal Dancing, 23 exclusives by Herbert, Kruder&Dorfmeister, Carl Craig...(2CD)
Various Artists: Miscellaneous, The 2nd Edition (Language compilation)
Endemic Void Equations
Hugo: La Formule
Aural Expansion: Remixed Sheep
Various Artists: Moving House, compiled by DJ Geoffroy a.k.a. Mugwump
Various Artists: Junglized (Selector compilation)
Various Artists: The Deepest Shade Of Techno, compiled by 4hero (2CD)
Ziryab Trio: Mashreq Classics

1997
Carl Craig More Songs About Food And Revolutionary Art
Barbara Gogan with Hector Zazou: Made On Earth
Various Artists: Freezone 4: Dangerous Lullabies, 22 exclusives by Basement Jaxx, Rhythm And Sound, Thievery Corporation...(2CD)
Juryman vs Spacer: Mail-Order Justice
Tuxedomoon: The Ghost Sonata (1991, reissued on Crammed in 1997)
Kočani Orkestar: L'Orient est rouge
Elixir: Alien Rainbow
Meira Asher: Dissected
Qmoog: The Arc Of Blueness
Subject 13: The Black Steele Project
Tao: Esoteric Red
Various Artists: Moving House 2, compiled by DJ Geoffroy a.k.a. Mugwump
Various Artists: Lysergic Factory, compiled by DJ Morpheus

1998
Taraf de Haïdouks: Dumbala Dumba
Buckfunk 3000: First Class Ticket To Telos
Auto Repeat: The Unbearable Lightness Of Auto-Repeating
Circadian Rhythms: Internal Clock
Various Artists: Freezone 5: The Radio Is Teaching My Goldfish Ju-Jitsu, 21 exclusives by Shawn J.Period, Jigmastas, Joe Claussell... (2CD)
Bossacucanova: Revisited Classics
Telex: I Don't Like Music, a collection of remixes
Various Artists: Moving House 3, compiled by DJ Geoffroy a.k.a. Mugwump
Various Artists: If U Can Beat 'Em, Break 'Em, compiled by DJ Morpheus
Various Artists: Phax'n'Phixion, The Nu Hip Hop Underground, compiled by DJ Morpheus
Various Artists: Junglized 2 (Selector compilation)
Various Artists: The Family Album, exclusive tracks by artists on the  Language label
Kevin Saunderson: Faces & Phases (2CD)

1999
Telex: I Don't Like Music 2, a collection of remixes
Meira Asher: Spears Into Hooks
Various Artists: Freezone 6: Fourth Person Singular, 22 exclusives by Alex Gopher, Stacey Pullen, Mark Pritchard... (2CD)
Zuco 103: Outro Lado
Phosphorus: Pillar Of Salt
Various Artists: Brasil 2mil - The Soul Of Bass-O-Nova
Suba (Mitar Subotić): São Paulo Confessions
Niko Marks & Eddie Fowlkes: City Boy Players
Various Artists: Moving House At Food Club
Various Artists: Tags Of The Times 2.0
Various Artists: The Beyond Real Experience, produced and compiled by DJ Spinna
Various Artists: Electric Kingdom - New Skool Breaks & Electro
Various Artists If It's Not 100% U.K. Hip Hop You Can Have Your Money Back, compiled by Tony Thorpe & Dave Watts

2000
Bebel Gilberto: Tanto Tempo
Sandy Dillon & Hector Zazou: 12 (Las Vegas Is Cursed)
Tek 9: Simply
Juryman: The Hill
Le PM: Les Petits Chefs
Sussan Deyhim: Madman of God
Various Artists: In My Bag, compiled by DJ Morpheus

2001
Taraf de Haïdouks: Band of Gypsies
Zuco 103: The Other Side of Outro Lado
Various Artists: Freezone: Seven Is Seven Is, 23 exclusives by Cibelle, Kid Koala, Tim 'Love' Lee... (2CD)
Trio Mocotó: Samba Rock
Various Artists: Samba Soul 70
Snooze: Goingmobile
Bossacucanova: Brasilidade
Bebel Gilberto: Tanto Tempo Remixes

2002
Kočani Orkestar: Alone at my Wedding
Suba (Mitar Subotić): Tributo
Zuco 103: Tales of High Fever
Juryman: Escape To Where
Sussan Deyhim/Bill Laswell: Shy Angels
Various Artists: Ziriguiboom: The Now Sound Of Brazil

2003
Electric Gypsyland 1 (Taraf de Haïdouks and Kočani Orkestar reinterpreted by Señor Coconut, Mercan Dede, Arto Lindsay & more)
Cibelle: Cibelle
Celso Fonseca: Natural
Benjamin Lew: Compiled Electronic Landscapes
Zuco 103: One Down, One Up (2CD)

2004
Bebel Gilberto: Bebel Gilberto
Tuxedomoon: Cabin In The Sky
Tuxedomoon: Seismic Riffs (DVD)
Mahala Rai Banda: Mahala Rai Banda
Trio Mocotó: Beleza! Beleza!! Beleza!!!
Bossacucanova: Uma Batida Diferente
Konono Nº1: Congotronics
Minimal Compact: Returning Wheel (3-CD box set, including new remixes and rarities)

2005
Celso Fonseca: Rive Gauche Rio
Bebel Gilberto: Bebel Gilberto Remixed
Apollo Nove: Res Inexplicata Volans feat. Cibelle, Seu Jorge etc.
DJ Dolores: Aparelhagem
Zuco 103: Whaa!
Cibelle: About A Girl EP (CD/DVD dualdisc)
Various Artists: Ziriguiboom: The Now Sound Of Brazil 2
Taraf de Haïdouks: The Continuing Adventures Of... (DVD+CD)
Congotronics 2, Buzz'n'Rumble in the Urb'n'Jungle, feat. Konono No.1, Kasai Allstars, Basokin... (CD+DVD)

2006
Tartit Abacabok
Think Of One: Trafico
Cibelle:The Shine Of Dried Electric Leaves
Electric Gypsyland 2 (Taraf de Haïdouks et al., reinterpreted by Tunng, Animal Collective, Nouvelle Vague, Susheela Raman & more)
Tuxedomoon: Bardo Hotel Soundtrack
Hugo: La Nuit des Balançoires
Wise In Time: The Ballad of Den The Men
Various Artists: Roots Of Rumba Rock 1+2 (1953–55) (originally out in 1992 and 1995, reissued as a 2CD in 2006)

2007
Tuxedomoon: Vapour Trails
Tuxedomoon: 77o7 TM (The 30th Anniversary Box) (3CD+1DVD)
Bebel Gilberto: Momento
Taraf de Haïdouks: Maskarada
Flat Earth Society: Psychoscout
Balkan Beat Box: Nu Med
Think Of One: Camping Shaabi
Shantel Disko Partizani!
Konono Nº1:  Live At Couleur Cafe
Various Artists: Sex & The Single Rabbit (a 2-volume compilation of Crammed electronic music tracks, digital-only)

2008
Kasai Allstars In The 7th Moon, The Chief Turned Into A Swimming Fish...
Kočani Orkestar: The Ravished Bride
DJ Dolores: 1 Real
Allá Es Tiempo
Balkan Beat Box: Nu-Made (CD+DVD)
Lonely Drifter Karen Grass Is Singing
U-cef: Halalwood
Hector Zazou & Swara: In The House Of Mirrors

2009
Staff Benda Bilili Tres Tres Fort
Bossacucanova: Ao Vivo (DVD+CD)
Mocky  Saskamodie
Shantel:Planet Paprika
Chicha Libre: Sonido Amazonico!
Les Tueurs de la lune de miel (a.k.a. The Honeymoon Killers): Special Manubre (originally out in 1977, reissued in 2009)
Akron/Family Set 'Em Wild, Set 'Em Free
Megafaun Gather, Form & Fly
Flat Earth Society: Cheer Me, Perverts
Zeep People & Things

2010
Konono N°1 Assume Crash Position
Lonely Drifter Karen: Fall Of Spring
Balkan Beat Box: Blue Eyed Black Boy
Cibelle: Las Venus Resort Palace Hotel
Axel Krygier: Pesebre
Various Artists: The Roots Of Chicha 2
Radioclit Presents: The Sound Of Club Secousse (African Dance Music Anthems)
Tradi-Mods vs Rockers: Alternative Takes on Congotronics feat. Deerhoof, Andrew Bird, Juana Molina, Micachu, Glenn Kotche & more (2CD)
Megafaun: Heretofore

2011
Skeletons: People
Taraf de Haïdouks & Kočani Orkestar: Band of Gypsies 2
Hoquets: Belgotronics
Various Artists: The Karindula Sessions (CD+DVD)
Tuxedomoon: Unearthed, previously-unreleased music and videos (CD+DVD)
Megafaun: Megafaun
The Real Tuesday Weld: The Last Werewolf
La Chiva Gantiva: Pelao
Maïa Vidal: God Is My Bike
Baloji: Kinshasa Succursale

2012
Zita Swoon Group: Wait For Me
Lonely Drifter Karen: Poles
Balkan Beat Box: Give
Jagwa Music: Bongo Hotheads
Chicha Libre: Canibalismo
Staff Benda Bilili: Bouger Le Monde 
SKIP&DIE: Riots In The Jungle 

2013
Amatorski: TBC (+ Same Stars We Shared)
Maïa Vidal: Spaces
NYNKE: Alter
Yasmine Hamdan: Ya Nass
Cibelle : ∆UNBINDING∆
SKIP&DIE : Remixed Riots
Amatorski : re:tbc
Brown Reininger Bodson : Clear Tears | Troubled Waters (features Steven Brown, Blaine L. Reininger and Maxime Bodson)
Juana Molina : Wed 21

2014
La Chiva Gantiva: Vivo
OY: No Problem Saloon
Amatorski: from clay to figures
Tuxedomoon: Pink Narcissus
Kasai Allstars: Beware The Fetish
Juana Molina: Segundo (re-issue - originally out in 2000)
Juana Molina: Tres Cosas (re-issue - originally out in 2002)
Juana Molina: Son (re-issue - originally out in 2006)
Juana Molina: Un día (re-issue - originally out in 2008)
Chancha Via Circuito: Amansara
Véronique Vincent & Aksak Maboul: Ex-Futur Album
Jozef Van Wissem: It Is Time For You To Return

2015
Taraf de Haïdouks: Of Lovers, Gamblers and Parachute Skirts
Axel Krygier: Hombre de piedra
SKIP&DIE: Cosmic Serpents
Bérangère Maximin: Dangerous Orbits
Soapkills: The Best of Soapkills
Maïa Vidal: You're The Waves
Tuxedomoon & Cult With No Name: Blue Velvet Revisited
Tuxedomoon: The Vinyl Box (retrospective, 10-LP boxed set)

2016
Konono N°1: Konono N°1 meets Batida
 Various Artists: Give Me New Noise: Half-Mute Revisited
Véronique Vincent & Aksak Maboul: Je pleure tout le temps EP (reworks & remixes)
OY: Space Diaspora
Acid Arab: Musique de France
Aquaserge: Guerre EP
Fauna Twin: The Hydra EP
Véronique Vincent & Aksak Maboul: 16 Visions of Ex-Futur (covers & reworks, feat. Jaakko Eino Kalevi, Aquaserge, Laetitia Sadier, Forever Pavot, Flavien Berger, Nite Jewel, Bullion, Burnt Friedman, Hello Skinny, Marc Collin, Bérangère Maximin, Lena Willikens and Aksak Maboul)

2017
Lula Pena: Archivo Pittoresco
Aquaserge: Laisse ça  être
Le Ton Mité: Passé composé futur conditionnel
Yasmine Hamdan: Al Jamilat
Kasai Allstars: Around Félicité
Juana Molina: Halo
Matias Aguayo & The Desdemonas: Sofarnopolis
Juana Molina: Un día (vinyl release)
Yasuaki Shimizu: Music For Commercials (vinyl reissue)
Zazou Bikaye CY1: Noir et Blanc (vinyl reissue)

2018
Aksak Maboul: Un peu de l'âme des bandits (vinyl reissue)
Aquaserge: Déjà-vous?
 Lio: Lio canta Caymmi
Yasmine Hamdan: Jamilat Reprise
Nova Materia: It Comes
Don The Tiger: Matanzas

2019
Scott Gilmore: Two Roomed Motel
Ekiti Sound: Abeg No Vex
Stubbleman: Mountains And Plains
Band Apart: Band Apart (vinyl reissue)
Matias Aguayo: Support Alien Invasion
Juana Molina: Forfun EP
Zap Mama: Adventures in Afropea (vinyl reissue)
Various Artists: Kinshasa 1978 (Originals & Reconstructions) - feat. Konono No.1, Sankayi, Martin Meissonnier 

2020
Doctor Fluorescent: Doctor Fluorescent  (feat. Scott Gilmore & Eddie Ruscha)
Aksak Maboul: Figures
Zenobia: Halak, Halak
Nihiloxica: Kaloli 
Ekiti Sound: Abeg No Vex Remixes vol.1 (digital EP)
Stubbleman: The Blackbird Tapes (digital EP)
Nova Materia: Live At Home (digital EP)

2021
Ikoqwe (Batida & Ikonoklasta
Kasai Allstars: Black Ants Always Fly Together...
Nova Materia: Xpujil
Aquaserge: The Possibility of a New Work for Aquaserge
Aksak Maboul: Redrawn Figures 1 and Redrawn Figures 2 

2022
Steven Brown: El Hombre Invisible
Congotronics International: Where's The One?

Crammed Samplers
It's A Crammed, Crammed World 1 (LP, 1984)
It's A Crammed, Crammed World 2 (LP, 1987)
The World According To Crammed (CD, 1993)
Crammed Global Soundclash 80-89 (2 separate CDs, or box set including bonus material, 2003)
20 Ways To Float Through Walls, a selection of tracks released between 2001 & 2007 (CD, 2007)
It's A Crammed, Crammed World 3, tracks from 2008/2009 (CD, 2009)
Crammed Walks With The Animals, tracks with titles containing animal names (CD, 2011)
 Crammed Goes To The Movies, tracks from or inspired by films (CD, 2011)

Awards and nominations

Awards
Grammy Award for Best Pop Collaboration (USA): Konono No1 (with Herbie Hancock) (2011)
Songlines Award for Best Group (UK): Staff Benda Bilili (2010)
Womex Artist Award of the Year: Staff Benda Bilili (2009)
Womex/World Music Charts Europe (EBU) Label Of The Year: Crammed Discs (2009)
BBC Awards for World Music (UK): Konono No1 (2006)
BBC Awards for World Music (UK): Shantel (2006)
Edison Award (The Netherlands): Taraf de Haïdouks (2006)
World Music Charts Europe (EBU) Label Of The Year: Crammed Discs (2005)
Womex Award of the Year: Marc Hollander and Crammed Discs (2004)
BBC Awards for World Music (UK): Think Of One (2004)
Mobo Award (Music Of Black Origin) (UK): Bebel Gilberto  (2004)
BBC Awards for World Music (UK): Taraf de Haïdouks (2002)
Edison Award (The Netherlands): Zelwer (1991)

Nominations
Grammy Awards (USA): Konono No1 (2007)
Grammy Awards (USA): Bebel Gilberto (2001, 2004 and 2007)
Impala Awards (Pan-European Indie Awards): Maïa Vidal (2011)
UK Music Video Awards: Maïa Vidal (2012)

Crammed Discs artists (past and present)

 4hero
 Akron/Family
 Acid Arab
 Aksak Maboul
 Allá
 Amatorski
 Apollo Nove
 Aquaserge
 Auto Repeat
 Axel Krygier
 Balkan Beat Box
 Baloji
 Bebel Gilberto
 Bel Canto
 Benjamin Lew
 Bérangère Maximin
 Bio Muse
 Karl Biscuit
 Bobvan
 Bossacucanova
 Buckfunk 3000
 Carl Craig
 Celso Fonseca
 Chancha Via Circuito
 Chicha Libre
 Cibelle
 Circadian Rhythm
 Colin Newman (Wire)
 Cult With No Name
 Daniel Schell
 DJ Dolores
 DJ Morpheus
 Dominic Sonic
 Don The Tiger
 Ekiti Sound
 Family Fodder
 Fauna Twin
 Flat Earth Society
 Fred Frith
 Hector Zazou
 Hermine Demoriane
 Hoquets
 Hugo
 Jagwa Music
 Jozef Van Wissem
 Juana Molina
 Juryman / Ian Simmonds
 Kasai Allstars
 Koçani Orkestar 
 Konono n°1
 La Chiva Gantiva
 Le PM
 Lonely Drifter Karen
 Lula Pena
 John Lurie
 Juana Molina
 Mahala Rai Banda
 Maïa Vidal
 Matias Aguayo & The Desdemonas
 Megafaun
 Meira Asher
 Minimal Compact
 Mocky
 Nynke
 Nova Materia
 Nihiloxica
 OY
 Peter Principle
 Qmoog
 Ramuntcho Matta
 Scott Gilmore
 Shantel
 Skeletons
 Skip&Die
 Snooze/ Dominique Dalcan
 Sonoko
 Staff Benda Bilili
 Stubbleman / (Pascal Gabriel)
 Suba
 Sussan Deyhim
 Taraf de Haïdouks
 Tartit
 Tek 9
 Telex
 The Gruesome Twosome
 The Honeymoon Killers (les Tueurs de la Lune de Miel)
 The Moody Boyz
 The Real Tuesday Weld
 Think Of One
 Trio Mocoto
 Tuxedomoon
 U-cef
Véronique Vincent & Aksak Maboul
 Wise In Time
 Yasmine Hamdan
 Zap Mama
 Zeep
 Zelwer
 Zenobia
 Zita Swoon Group
 Zuco 103

References

External links
 
 The Ziriguiboom imprint
 The Congotronics Series
 Crammed Discs Week, a series of acoustic live videos with several Crammed bands, shot in 2007 by Vincent Moon as part of the Take-Away Shows
Crammed Discs' channel on YouTube

Belgian independent record labels
Companies based in Brussels
Mass media in Brussels
Music in Brussels
Record labels established in 1980
World music record labels
Pop record labels
Electronic music record labels